Namdeo Jadhav, PVSM, VC (18 November 1921 – 2 August 1984) was an Indian recipient of the Victoria Cross, the highest and most prestigious award for gallantry in the face of the enemy that can be awarded to British and Commonwealth forces.

Details
Jadhav was 23 years old, and a Sepoy in the 1st Battalion, 5th Mahratta Light Infantry in the Indian Army during World War II when the following deed took place during the Spring 1945 offensive in Italy for which he was awarded the VC.

On 9 April 1945 at the Senio River, Italy, when a small party were almost wiped out in an assault on the east floodbank of the river, Sepoy Namdeo Jadhav carried two wounded men under heavy fire through deep water, up a steep bank and through a mine belt to safety. Then, determined to avenge his dead comrades, he eliminated three enemy machine-gun posts. Finally, climbing on top of the bank he shouted the Maratha war cry and waved the remaining companies across. He not only saved many lives but enabled the battalion to secure the bridgehead and ultimately to crush all enemy resistance in the area.

The citation reads:

To commemorate his act of exceptional bravery a bust has been placed at the Aundh military station in Pune.
Adv Mr J.S.Savant, Bombay President, Maratha Recruitment Board, felicitated him for Victoria Cross, the highest and most prestigious award for gallantry in the face of the enemy that can be awarded to British and Commonwealth forces.

Further information
He later reached the rank of havildar. On 9 April 2017 the Mayor of Lugo di Romagna Davide Ranalli unveiled a Memorial dedicated to VC Namdeo Jadhav upon the Senio River eastern bank in the vicinity of San Potito. The ceremony was attended by Brigadier Yogi Sheoran, Defence Wing Attaché of the Indian Embassy in Rome.

References

External links
Namdeo Jadhav
Medal entitlement
Burial location

1921 births
1984 deaths
Indian World War II recipients of the Victoria Cross
British Indian Army soldiers
Indian Army personnel of World War II
Military personnel from Mumbai
Recipients of the Param Vishisht Seva Medal